Illinois Territory's at-large congressional district was a congressional district that encompassed the entire Illinois Territory. The territory was established on March 1, 1809 from portions of Indiana Territory.   The district elected a non-voting delegate to the United States House of Representatives.

List of delegates representing the district

Statehood
On April 18, 1818, Congress passed an act that enabled the people of Illinois Territory to begin the process of forming a state. As part of that act, Illinois Territory was reduced in size to the boundaries of the present state. The remainder of what had been Illinois Territory was attached to Michigan Territory. The state of Illinois was accepted into the Union on December 3, 1818.

References

See also
 Northwest Territory's at-large congressional district
 Wisconsin Territory's at-large congressional district
 Michigan Territory's at-large congressional district
 Minnesota Territory's at-large congressional district

Territory At-large
Former congressional districts of the United States
At-large United States congressional districts
Constituencies established in 1812
1812 establishments in Illinois Territory
Constituencies disestablished in 1818
1818 disestablishments in Illinois Territory